Matej Hrstić (born 11 August 1996) is a Croatian handball player for Limoges Handball and the Croatian national team.

He represented Croatia at the 2020 European Men's Handball Championship.

References

External links

1996 births
Living people
People from Ljubuški
Croatian male handball players
Croats of Bosnia and Herzegovina
RK Zagreb players